Nassauvia is a genus of flowering plants in the tribe Nassauvieae within the family Asteraceae. It is native to Argentina, Bolivia, Chile and the Falkland Islands.

Nassauvia is said to be chocolate scented.

Species

Formerly included

Numerous species are now considered more suitable to other genera: Calopappus Triptilion

References

External links

Nassauvieae
Asteraceae genera
Flora of South America
Taxa named by Philibert Commerson
Taxonomy articles created by Polbot